Rosewarne is a hamlet in west Cornwall, England, in the parish of Gwinear-Gwithian, near Reawla. The name of the hamlet comes from the Cornish language Roswern, containing the elements ros, meaning 'hill-spur', and gwern, meaning 'alder marsh'.

Rosewarne is also the name of an area north of Camborne, which is one of two sites of an agricultural college run by the Duchy College Rural Business School.

References

Hamlets in Cornwall
Camborne